Equals Pi is a painting created by American artist Jean-Michel Basquiat in 1982. The painting was published in GQ magazine in 1983 and W magazine in 2018.

History 
Equals Pi was executed by Jean-Michel Basquiat in 1982, which is considered his most coveted year. The robin egg blue painting contains Basquiat's signature crown motif and a head alongside his characteristic scrawled text with phrases such as "AMORITE," "TEN YEN" and "DUNCE." The title refers to the mathematical equations incorporated on the right side of the work. The cone refers to the pointed dunce caps depicted in the work.

The painting was acquired in 1982 by Anne Dayton, who was the advertising manager of Artforum magazine. She purchase it for $7,000 from Basquiat's exhibition at the Fun Gallery in the East Village. At the time the painting was called Still Pi, however, when the work appeared in the March 1983 issue of GQ magazine, it was titled Knowledge of the Cone, which is written on the top of the painting. 

According to reports in August 2021, the luxury jewelry brand Tiffany & Co. had recently acquired the painting privately from the Sabbadini family, for a price in the range of $15 million to $20 million. The painting, which is the brand's signature blue color, will eventually be displayed in Tiffany’s New York flagship boutique on Fifth Avenue, which is currently undergoing renovation. Although initial reports claimed that the painting was never seen before, it was previously offered at auction twice and had appeared in magazines. The work was first offered at a Sotheby’s sale in London in June 1990, where it went unsold. In December 1996, the Sabbadinis, a Milan-based clan behind the eponymous jewelry house, purchased it during a Sotheby's London auction for $253,000. Mother and daughter Stefania and Micól Sabbadini posed in front of the painting in their living room for a 2018 feature in W magazine. Stephen Torton, a former assistant of Basquiat’s posted an Instagram statement saying, “I designed and built stretchers, painted backgrounds, glued drawings down on canvas, chauffeured, traveled extensively, spoke freely about many topics and worked endless hours side by side in silence. The idea that this blue background, which I mixed and applied was in any way related to Tiffany Blue is so absurd that at first I chose not to comment. But this very perverse appropriation of the artist’s inspiration is too much.”

See also 

 List of paintings by Jean-Michel Basquiat

References 

1982 paintings
Paintings by Jean-Michel Basquiat